Gasca may refer to:

People
 Pedro de la Gasca (1485–1567), Spanish bishop and viceroy
 Teresa Alcocer y Gasca (born 1952), Mexican politician

Places
 Gâsca, Romania
 Gâsca River, Romania